The Platonic Marriage (German: Die platonische Ehe) is a 1919 German silent drama film directed by Paul Leni and starring Mia May, Georg Alexander and Albert Paulig. An impoverished nobleman marries a woman he finds unattractive simply to get his hands on her money. However, he gradually finds himself falling in love with her.

Leni also worked as art director, designing the film's sets.

Cast
 Mia May
 Georg Alexander
 Albert Paulig
 Hermann Picha
 Ferry Sikla
 Kitty Dewall

References

Bibliography
 Hans-Michael Bock & Michael Töteberg. Das Ufa-Buch. Zweitausendeins, 1992.

External links

1919 films
Films of the Weimar Republic
German silent feature films
Films directed by Paul Leni
UFA GmbH films
German black-and-white films
German drama films
1919 drama films
Silent drama films
1910s German films